Arif Özen (born 1 January 1998) is a Turkish freestyle wrestler competing in the 86 kg division. He is a member of  Sancaktepe Belediye S.K.

Career 
In 2018, he won the gold medal in the men's 86 kg event at the 2018 European Juniors Wrestling Championships held in Rome, Italy.

Arif Özen won the gold medal in the Greco-Roman style 86 kg at the 2018 World Junior Wrestling Championships in Trnava, Slovakia. Competing in the 86 kg category, Özen defeated Indian opponent Dupiak Punia by a 2–1 score.

In 2019, he won the silver medal in the men's 86 kg event at the 2019 European U23 Wrestling Championship  held in Novi Sad, Serbia.

References

External links 
 

1998 births
Living people
Turkish male sport wrestlers
20th-century Turkish people
21st-century Turkish people